Pirmasens ((also Bermesens or Bärmasens)) is an independent town in Rhineland-Palatinate, Germany, near the border with France. It was famous for the manufacture of shoes. The surrounding rural district was called Landkreis Pirmasens from 1818 until 1997, when it was renamed to Südwestpfalz.

Pirmasens can be easily mistaken with Primasens, of which means a first sense in Latin-derived languages (the first sense in Latin would be "primus sensus").

History

Early years
The first mention of "Pirminiseusna", a colony of Hornbach Abbey, dates from 860. The name derives from St. Pirminius, the founder of the monastery. During the period it was under rule of the Bishopric of Metz. It was passed to Diocese of Speyer in last the quarter of the 11th century, then was captured by County of Saarbrücken in 1100.

In 1182, the County of Saarbrücken was divided by Simon II and Henry I, who were sons of Simon I. Pirmasens was given to the latter and Henry I's dominion was named as County of Zweibrücken. He built Lemberg Castle for protecting his dominion in 1198. During the period Pirmasens was formal jurisdiction in Bishop of Metz. But, parish administration of Pirmasens was passed to monastery of Hornbach after confirmation of John, Bishop of Metz in 1225.

In 1297, County of Zweibrücken was divided and Pirmasens was passed to County of Zweibrücken-Bitsch, Eberhard I's dominion. He traded some localities with Duke Frederick III of Lorraine and took lordship of Bitsch at same year.

In 1525, during German Peasants' War, Pirmasens was looted by peasants of Bitsch.

In 1560, Ludowika Margaretha of Zweibrücken-Bitsch, was daughter of Count James of Zweibrücken-Bitsch (1510–1570), was the last male member of the House of Zweibrücken, was married of Philip V, Count of Hanau-Lichtenberg. In 1570, County of James of Zweibrücken-Bitsch died without male heir and Countess Ludowika Margaretha inherited the County of Bitsch, the Lordship of Ochsenstein and half the Lordship of Lichtenberg (his father already held the other half). James's older brother, Simon V Wecker, had already died in 1540, also without a male heir. A dispute about the inheritance erupted between the husbands of Ludowika Margaretha and her cousin Amalie, Philip V of Hanau-Lichtenberg and Philip I of Leiningen-Westerburg, respectively. Formally, the County of Bitsch and district of Lemberg were fiefs of the Duchy of Lorraine and such fiefs could only be inherited in the male line.

Philip V was initially successful in the dispute with Philip I about Zweibrücken-Bitsch. However, he introduced the Lutheran confession in his newly gained territories in 1572. This upset his powerful Catholic neighbour and liege lord, Duke Charles III of Lorraine. The Duke terminated the fief and in July 1572 Lorraine troops occupied the county. Since Philip V's army was no match for Lorraine, he took his case to the Imperial Chamber Court in Speyer. During the trial, Lorraine argued that, firstly, a significant part of the territory of Zweibrücken-Bitsch had been obtained in an exchange with Lorraine in 1302 and, secondly, the Counts of Leiningen had sold their hereditary claims to Lorraine in 1573. In 1604, Hanau-Lichtenberg and Lorraine decided to settle out of court. In a treaty signed in 1606, it was agreed that Bitsch would revert to Lorraine and Hanau-Lichtenberg would retain Lemberg. This was reasonable, as it corresponded approximately to the religious realities of the territories. Since then, Pirmasens was part of the Amt Lemberg in the County of Hanau-Lichtenberg.

Before the Thirty Years War, Pirmasens had 59 families and about 235 inhabitants resident, whereas in Lemberg were counted 54 families (about 215 people). When counting is assumed that at that time there was a family of four to five people. In 1622, Pirmasens and Lemberg were ravaged by Spaniards and Croatian horsemen of the Imperial troops. The imperial army set fire to the village. Even the church was destroyed in a fire, after the withdrawal of the troops, Pirmasenser began to rebuild it. It was again ravaged by imperial troops under Matthias Gallas. They also looted Lemberg Castle, which was burned in 1636. Then the headquarters of the Lutheran parish of Lemberg was moved to Pirmasens. But, it was heavily damaged in it. In 1657, only 9 families (about 40 people) were lived in it. However, the population slowly increased by the immigration of Reformed Swiss, Catholic Tyrolean as well as Franconian and Württembergian families, so that in 1661 21 families (about 87 people) were counted in Pirmasens. However, during the Franco-Dutch War in 1677, the city was burned down again, this time by French troops. During the Nine Years' War, it was sacked by French troops under General de Ezéchiel Mélac, who devastated the Palatinate in 1689. In 1691, only 16 people lived in the village of Pirmasens. At the same time, the part of Lemberg Castle that was still habitable after the Thirty Years' War, was completely destroyed. Thus, the administrative centre of Amt Lemberg was moved to Pirmasens in 1697. This made Pirmasens the most important locality of the region.

In 1736, Johann Reinhard III, the last count of Hanau-Lichtenberg, died without male heir and the duchy passed to his grandson, Landgrave Ludwig IX of Hesse-Darmstadt, the son of Countess Charlotte of Hanau-Lichtenberg, sole heir of County of Hanau Lichtenberg, and Ludwig VIII, Landgrave of Hesse-Darmstadt.

Landgrave Ludwig IX took residence in his grandfathers hunting lodge in Pirmasens and established a garrison. In 1763, Pirmasens was granted city rights by Ludwig IX who stayed in his small residence even after taking office in Hesse-Darmstadt due to his father's death in 1768. The garrison was continuously expanded, a town hall, two churches and a large exercise hall were erected. Residence and garrison abruptly ended with the landgrave's death in 1790.

In 1793, it was the location of the Battle of Pirmasens between Prussia and the French Corps of the Vosges. The French lost the battle, but their opponents' divisions nevertheless enabled them to return and occupy Pirmasens by the end of the year: between 1798 and 1814, the town was included in the French département of Mont-Tonnerre ("Donnersberg-Département" in German). After the French defeat, it was made part of Bavaria together with the Rhenish Palatinate.

20th century

 1923/24 tests of Palatinate separatists to settle down in Pirmasens failed on 12 February 1924: occupation of the district town hall, home of the separatist administration; many deaths on both sides
 9 November 1938 destruction of the synagogue during the Kristallnacht.
On 15 March 1945 Pirmasens was captured by US troops, and the following year it became part of the newly founded Bundesland Rhineland-Palatinate. During the occupation on Sept. 19 the Museum of Pirmasens announced that about 50 paintings which had been stored in the air-raid shelter at Husterhoh School during the war have been plundered during the arrival of the American troops. The paintings were returned in 2006.

Main sights

 Dynamikum, a science museum
 Old Postal Building, with an exhibition of the life and work of Hugo Ball and a picture gallery of the painter Heinrich Bürkel
 Collected works of Hugo Ball in the public library
 Old Town Hall, now a museum of local history and shoes, with silhouettes from Elisabeth Emmler
 Siegfried Line Museum
 Stierbrunnen (Central of the Shopping Area)
 Exerzierplatz (The geographical center of the city)
 Countless forests and springs around the city

Incorporations
 1969: Erlenbrunn, Fehrbach, Hengsberg, Niedersimten, Winzeln
 1972: Gersbach, Windsberg

Evolution of population (since 1875):

Politics
Town council as at August 2014:
CDU 40.7% – 18 seats
SPD 28.0% – 12 seats
FWG 10.4% – 5 seats 
REP 4.6% – 2 seats
FDP 4.0% – 2 seats
Die Linke 5.0% – 2 seats
The Greens 4.6% – 2 seats
National Democratic Party of Germany 2.0% – 1 seat

Twin towns – sister cities

Pirmasens is twinned with:
 Poissy, France

Culture

Events
 the "Landgrafen-Tage" (days of the landgraves) - every second weekend in April
 Open-Air Highlights at the parade-ground (e.g. musicals, opera)
 "Schlabbeflicker-Fest", a parade of uniformed musicians - every first weekend in August
 Parade-ground festival - every second weekend in September
 Euroclassic festival (Festival of the cities: Pirmasens, Bitche, Zweibrücken, Blieskastel and of the Verbandsgemeinde Zweibrücken-Land)
 "Grenadiermarkt" (infantryman market) - in Autumn
 "Novembermarkt" - last weekend of October or first weekend of November
 Christmas market in Advent
 Yearly Conventions like "Culinaria"

Music
 Choir of oratory Pirmasens
 Chantor's house of Pirmasens

Theatre
 Performances at the festival hall

Sport

 FK Pirmasens
 TV 1863 Pirmasens
 VFB Pirmasens
 GW Pirmasens
 SG Pirmasens
 Rot-Weiß Pirmasens
 Blau-Weiß Pirmasens
 ASV Pirmasens
 TTC Pirmasens
 TUS/DJK Pirmasens
 SV 1907 Ruhbank
 RC Pirmasens
 1. Boule Verein Pirmasens
 MTV 1873 Pirmasens

Companies
 Carl Semler shoe factory
 ZWAANS GmbH - Import/Export of tannery machines, orthopedic branche
 Ergo-Fit - manufacturer of cardiology equipment
 FWB Kunststofftechnik GmbH - injection moulding
 Apoplex medical technologies GmbH - products for the prevention of stroke
 Cytoimmun diagnostics GmbH - cervical cancer screening 
 Koch Maschinenbau GmbH - engineering
 Peter Kaiser GmbH - Germany's oldest shoe-factory
 Park&Bellheimer AG - brewery
 Profine GmbH, Kömmerling - manufacturer of synthetic material; major company
 psb GmbH
 SympaTel Telemarketing GmbH
 WAFO GmbH - specialist in the abrasion technique
 WAWI Euro GmbH - chocolate factory
 "Pirmasenser Zeitung" local newspaper
 "Die Rheinpfalz" local newspaper
 KD Schaltanlagenbau
 CONVAR Deutschland GmbH - provides data recovery of hard drives within difficult setups
 Footwear Concept and Design GmbH - Shoe design, Outsole design, mould manufacture and rapid prototyping
 Dampf-Shop GmbH
 WHG-Rahn GmbH - Systems for heating and cooling, plumbing
 Framas
 WASGAU AG

Education 
 Fachhochschule Kaiserslautern, Campus Pirmasens located in Pirmasens
 Deutsche Schuhfachschule

Notable people
Heinrich Bürkel (1802–1869), genre and landscape painter
Godfrey Weitzel (1835–1884), Union Army general during the American Civil War
Hugo Ball (1886–1927), author, poet, founder of the Dada movement
Betty Amann (1905–1990), actor
Ralph H. Baer (1922–2014), German-American inventor, game developer and engineer
Julian Steckel (born 1982), cellist
Erik Durm (born 1992), footballer

Military
Husterhoeh Kaserne was a former (1945–1994) US military facility in Pirmasens, and is now a mostly closed Bundeswehr facility, which still hosts U.S. Army Medical Materiel Center – Europe. It was a constituent member of the Kaiserslautern Military Community.

Gallery

References

Further reading
 J.B.Lehnung, Geliebtes Pirmasens, 12 Bände, Pirmasens (Komet), 1978 ff. [with a lot of photos]
Gräber/Spindler, Die Pfalzbefreier, Ludwigshafen/Rhein, 2005 [discussed separatism]

External links

Official website 
Westwallmuseum 
Museum Dynamikum 

 
Palatinate Forest
Palatinate (region)